Undulambia asaphalis is a moth in the family Crambidae described by William Schaus in 1924. It is found in Peru.

The wingspan is about 16 mm. The wings are white, with yellow-ocher markings, finely edged with black.

References

Moths described in 1924
Musotiminae